Julie Stevens is an American actress, singer, director, producer and studio teacher who has been performing since childhood.

Biography
Stevens is the co-director, co-producer of the documentary film, Life After Tomorrow, about the child performers in the musical Annie. She began her performing career at age nine, appearing on Broadway in Annie. TV movies, commercials, recording projects and many stage roles followed. Voice-over credits include looping and dubbing for film and television. Stevens is the singing voice of Erika in the animated musical feature film, Barbie as the Princess and the Pauper.

She is a graduate of Central High School, New York University (BFA), and Bank Street College of Education (MS).

Filmography
2004: Barbie as the Princess and the Pauper: Erika (singing voice)
2006: Life After Tomorrow

Theater
Annie: Pepper (on Broadway)

References

External links

American stage actresses
1967 births
Living people
New York University alumni
Bank Street College of Education alumni
Central High School (Philadelphia) alumni
21st-century American actresses